Dear Comrade is the soundtrack album for the 2019 Telugu-language action drama film of the same name written and directed by Bharat Kamma and produced by Mythri Movie Makers and Yash Rangineni, starring Vijay Devarakonda, Rashmika Mandanna in the lead roles. The music is composed by Justin Prabhakaran, in his debut Telugu film. The film's soundtrack was released in Telugu, Tamil, Malayalam and Kannada languages. Lyrics were written by Rehman, Chaitanya Prasad and Krishna Kanth for Telugu, Karthik Netha, Viveka, Mohan Rajan, Stony Psyko, Dope Daddy and Justin Prabhakaran for Tamil, Joe Paul and Dhananjay Ranjan for Malayalam and Kannada languages respectively.

Release 
The film's first single track "Nee Neeli Kannullona" was released on 8 May 2019, with Gowtham Bharadwaj, rendering the song. The Times of India, stated that it is a sweet romantic ballad, talking of a man's love for his lady love. The song "Kadalalle" which featured in the film's teaser, was released as the film's second single on 17 May 2019, in which Sid Sriram and Aishwarya Ravichandran rendered the song. Although, the song is scheduled to release on 15 May, it was delayed two days due to technical difficulties, which led the crew to apologise their fans. It was released as "Pularaadha" in Tamil, "Madhupole" in Malayalam, and "Kadalanthe" in Kannada, where Sriram made his debut in Kannada as playback singer. It was considered as a soulful romantic duet. The third single "Girra Girra" was released on 23 May 2019, and was sung by Gowtham Bharadwaj and Yamini Ghantasala.

The fourth single, "The Canteen Song" was released on 31 May 2019, with four music directors Karthik Rodriguez, Nivas K. Prasanna, Jakes Bejoy and Charan Raj lent their voices in all four languages. The fifth single track, titled "Comrade Anthem" was released on 5 June 2019. The song was sung by Vijay Deverakonda for the original version, while actor Vijay Sethupathi and Dulquer Salmaan recorded its Tamil and Malayalam versions respectively. The entire soundtrack album which features all the other three songs, was released by Lahari Music on 7 June 2019.

Marketing 
As a part of the film's marketing purposes, a promotional music event titled as "Dear Comrade Music Festival" which was sponsored by Helo India took place in Bengaluru on 22 June 2019, Cochin on 23 June 2019, Chennai on 29 June 2019 and in Hyderabad on 1 July 2019.

Reception 
Siddhartha Toleti of Mirchi9 reviewed it as "an out-and-out classy thematic album." Neetishta Nyayapati of The Times of India, summarised it as "The album of Dear Comrade is mixed bag with Justin Prabhakaran and lyricist Rehman going all out to bring in their best. The OST seems like it has something to offer for everyone, mirroring every kind of mood. Give this album a chance this weekend if you are looking for dreamy numbers that also make you think." 123Telugu.com reviewed it as "On the whole, the album of Dear Comrade has eight different kinds of songs. But what stands out are the romantic numbers which have been composed superbly by music director Justin Prabhakaran. Kadalalle, Gira Gira, O Kalala Kathala and Neenli Neeli Kannullone our picks and will be bigger hits once the film is out. For now, the songs have set the right tone for the romantic drama and the chemistry of Vijay Devarakonda and Rashmika will make these songs even more popular in the coming days." Indiaglitz reviewed it as "The eight songs are earnest and betray the deep creative effort that went into creating them" and gave a rating of 3.25 out of 5.

Track listing
Telugu

Tamil

Malayalam

Kannada

Personnel 
Credits adapted from Lahari Music

 Justin Prabhakaran – Composer, Arranger, Producer
 Sam P Keerthan – Backing Vocals
 Senthil Dass – Backing Vocals
 Dr Narayanan – Backing Vocals
 Yogi Sekar – Backing Vocals
 Shibi Srinivasan – Backing Vocals
 Deepesh Krishnamoorthy – Backing Vocals
 Varun Kumar – Backing Vocals
 Naveen Raj – Backing Vocals
 Deepak Blue – Backing Vocals
 Vikram – Backing Vocals
 Sarath Santhosh – Backing Vocals
 Ajaey Shravan – Backing Vocals
 Sugandh Shekar – Backing Vocals
 Govind Prasad – Backing Vocals
 Pavan – Backing Vocals
 Yogaraj – Backing Vocals
 Velu – Backing Vocals
 Aravindh Raj – Backing Vocals
 Vijay Anand – Backing Vocals
 M. Nagarajan – Backing Vocals
 Muthuraman – Backing Vocals
 Antony Raj – Backing Vocals
 Perumal Varadhan – Backing Vocals
 Priya Prakash – Backing Vocals
 Karpagam – Backing Vocals
 Nincy Vencent – Backing Vocals
 Sharmila – Backing Vocals
 Shanthi – Backing Vocals
 Hemambiga – Backing Vocals
 Vijai Bulganin – Vocal Conductor
 Rama Krishna – Lyrics Conductor
 P. Vijay Ananth – Flute, Ocarina
 Seenu – Electric Mandolin, Ektara, Esraj, Swarmandal, Xylophone, Pipa, Santoor, Sarod, Ukulele
 Balaji – Electric Violin
 Josh Mark Raj – Acoustic Guitar, Electric Guitar
 Joseph Vijay – Acoustic Guitar
 Sam Solomon – Acoustic Guitar
 Naveen – Bass Guitar
 Thomas Xavier – Brass
 Maxwell Rajan – Brass
 Martin Vijay – Brass
 Irudayaraj Babu – Brass
 Bala Subramani – Nadaswaram
 Sebastian Sathish – Keys
 Balu – Tavil
 Kavi Raj – Ganjira, Percussions
 Shruthi Raj – Tapes
 Barath Dhanasekar – Live Drums, Percussions, Rhythm and Synthesizer Arrangement
 T. Raja – Percussions
 Kumar – Percussions
 Karthik Vamsi – Percussions
 Venkat – Percussions
 Antony Raj – Musicians Co-Ordinator (The Station Inn)
 Nirmal Raj – Musicians Co-Ordinator (Hymn Studio)
 Sujith Sreedhar – Recording Engineer (2BarQ Studios)
 Adithyan – Recording Engineer (2BarQ Studios)
 Akhil Alex Mathew – Recording Engineer (2BarQ Studios)
 Abishek Mahendiran – Recording Engineer (2BarQ Studios)
 Lijesh – Recording Engineer (Voice and Vision Studios)
 Biju – Recording Engineer (Inspired One Studio)
 Senthil Prasad – Recording Engineer (Vanaj Kesav Digi Audio Waves)
 Vishnu Namboothiri – Recording Engineer (Krimson Avenue Studios)
 Balu Thankachan – Audio Mixing (20db Studios)
 Elwin Joseph – Audio Mixing (20db Studios)
 Hariharan – Audio Mixing (20db Studios)
 Thiru – Audio Mixing (Berachah Studios)
 Shadab Rayeen – Audio Mastering (New Edge Studios)
 Vivek Thomas – Audio Mastering (Berachah Studios)
 David Selvam – Audio Mastering (Berachah Studios)

References 

Telugu film soundtracks
2019 soundtrack albums